Efftee Studios was an early Australian film and theatre production studio, established by F.W. Thring (the name 'Efftee' deriving from his initials, 'FT' for Francis Thring) in 1930. It existed until Thring's death in 1935. Initially Efftee Films was based in Melbourne and used optical sound equipment imported from the US.

History
In 1931, the company produced the first commercially viable Australian made sound feature film, Diggers. Over the next five years, Efftee produced nine features, over 80 shorts and several stage productions, including the Australian musicals Collits' Inn (1933) and The Cedar Tree (1934). Notable collaborators include C. J. Dennis, George Wallace and Frank Harvey.

In 1934, Thring suspended Efftee's operations to pressure the government to establish a quota for Australian films, threatening to move production to London. He relocated production to Sydney to take advantage of the New South Wales Cinematograph Films (Australian Quota) Act 1935.

Efftee was also the first operator of Melbourne radio station 3XY which began broadcasting on 9 September 1935.

Thring traveled to Hollywood in March 1936 to look for scriptwriters and actors and returned in June but died soon after.

Founder F.W. Thring was the father of the Australian and international actor, Frank Thring.

Selected filmography

Features
A Co-respondent's Course (1931)
Diggers (1931)
The Haunted Barn (1931)
The Sentimental Bloke (1932)
His Royal Highness (1932)
Harmony Row (1933)
A Ticket in Tatts (1934)
Sheepmates (1934) – abandoned during filming
The Streets of London (1934)
Clara Gibbings (1934)

Non-Efftee features shot in the Efftee Studio
Diggers in Blighty (1933)
Waltzing Matilda (1933)
Heritage (1935)

The 'Efftee Entertainers' Variety Shorts

Will Cade and his Regent Theatre Orchestra in Selections from 'The Desert Song''' (1931)Jack O'Hagan – Vocalist Composer (1931) – with Jack O'HaganCecil Parkes' Strad Trio in Selections from Their Repertoire (1931)Athol Tier as Napoleon (1931)Keith Desmond in Recitations (No. 1) (1931)Keith Desmond in Recitations (No. 2) (1931)George Wallace, Australia's Premier Comedian (1931) – with George WallaceMelody and Terpsichor (1931)Stan Ray and George Moon Jnr, Speciality Dancers (No. 1) (1931)Stan Ray and George Moon Jnr, Speciality Dancers (No. 2) (1931)Melbourne's Chinese Orchestra in Selections (1931)Minnie Love in Impressions of Famous Artists (No. 1) (1931) Minnie Love in Impressions of Famous Artists (No. 2) (1931) Minnie Love in Impressions of Famous Artists (No. 3) (1931) The Sundowners – Harmony Quartette (No. 1) (1932)The Sundowners – Harmony Quartette (No. 2) (1932)Lou Vernon – Character Songs (No. 1) (1932)Kathleen Goodall – Songs at the Piano (No. 1) (1932)Kathleen Goodall – Songs at the Piano (No. 2) (1932)Kathleen Goodall – Songs at the Piano (No. 3) (1932)Peter Bornstein, Celebrated Violinist (1932)George White (1932)Miss Ada Reeve – Comedienne (No. 1) (1932) – with Ada ReeveMiss Ada Reeve – Comedienne (No. 2) (1932)Miss Byrl Walkley, Soprano (1932)Somewhere South of Shanghai, Rendered by Marshall Crosby (1932)Neil McKay, Scottish Comedian (1932) – with Neil McKayWilliamson Imperial Grand Opera Co. Orchestra – Overture from Carmen, by Bizet (1932)Williamson Imperial Grand Opera Co. Orchestra – Overture from Gounod's Faust (1932)Williamson Imperial Grand Opera Co. Orchestra – Selections from the Barber of Seville by Rossini (1932)Signor Apollo Granforte and the Williamson Imperial Grand opera Company Orchestra (1932)Lou Vernon – Character Songs (No. 2) (1932)

Two-Reel Efftee shortsOh, What a Night! (1932) – 14-minute short starring George WallaceIn the Future (1933) – 12-minute short

Theatre showsCollit's Inn (1933)The Beloved Vagabond (1934) – done in MelbourneMother of Pearl (1934) – done in Melbourne Her Past (1934)Jolly Roger (1934)Children in Uniform (1934)S.S. Sunshine (1935)The Cedar Tree (1934)Crazy Nights Revue (1935)The Oojah Bird (1935)Rope (1934)Streets of London (1933) – later filmedClara Gibbings (1933) – later filmed

Unmade films
adaptation of Ginger Murdoch, a book by William Hatfield, but it never eventuated
adaptation of Collitt's Innadaptation of the book James! Don't Be a Fool by E. V. Timms with an adaptation by John P. McLeod
adaptation of John P. McLeod's book Along the Road with a script to be done by McLeodA Sweepin' the Deep with George Wallace
adaptation of Redheap by Norman Lindsay – £1,000 reportedly paid for the rightsTyphoon Treasure – later made by others
adaptation of Robbery Under Arms as a stage musical then a film

See also
Cinema of Australia

References

Sources
Efftee Film Productions at National Film and Sound Archive
Chris Long, 'The Efftee Legacy', Cinema Papers'', December 1982 p 521
Efftee theatre productions at AusStage
Efftee Entertainers at Oz Movies
Efftee's Australia at Oz Movies
Efftee Entertainers at Australian Variety Theatre Archive

Film production companies of Australia